Marianna Ucrìa is a 1997 Italian drama film directed by Roberto Faenza. It was entered into the 20th Moscow International Film Festival.

Plot
In Sicily, in the first half of the eighteenth century, the twelve-year-old Marianna Ucrìa was taken by her grandfather to watch a hanging, in the hope that the show could make her recover from silence. But all is in vain. Marianna does not speak and does not hear. She is thus induced by her mother to marry her uncle Pietro and, when she reaches sixteen, she has already given birth to three children. Having become a young woman, she welcomes the visit of Grass, a French instructor who initiates her to sign language and introduces her to the Enlightenment philosophical ideas that move around Europe. When her husband dies, Marianna finds herself having to manage her life and relationships with others. She thus demonstrates that she has acquired a strong personality that allows her to govern relationships with easement and an important romantic relationship with the brother of her servant Fila. By now a mature and conscious woman, Marianna is able to understand the terrible secret that had been hidden to her: her silence came from the trauma caused by the sexual violence suffered by her uncle Pietro.

Cast
 Emmanuelle Laborit as Marianna Ucrìa
 Bernard Giraudeau as Grass
 Laura Morante as Maria
 Philippe Noiret as Duke Signoretto, grandfather of Marianna
 Laura Betti as Giuseppa
 Leopoldo Trieste as Pretore Camaleo
 Lorenzo Crespi as Saro
 Roberto Herlitzka as Duke Pietro
 Silvana Gasparini as Fiammetta
 Eva Grieco as Marianna when child
 Selvaggia Quattrini as Fila
 Pamela Saino as Giuseppa when child

Reception
The film opened in Italy on 39 screens and grossed $155,893 for the weekend, placing tenth at the box office. After four weeks it had grossed $779,270.

See also

List of films featuring the deaf and hard of hearing

References

External links
 

1997 films
1997 drama films
Italian drama films
1990s Italian-language films
Incest in film
Films directed by Roberto Faenza
Films scored by Ennio Morricone
Films set in the 18th century
1990s Italian films